The Bulletin is a daily newspaper covering eastern Connecticut, United States, based in the city of Norwich and owned by Gannett. The newspaper has been in continuous publication since 1796.

Gannett bought what was then called the Norwich Bulletin in November 1981.  On April 12, 2007, it was announced that GateHouse Media bought the newspaper.

In 2010, the paper expanded its coverage area and began publishing two different editions, one for southeastern Connecticut and one for the northeastern part of the state. In February 2011, in an effort to reflect the paper's wide geographic range, its name was changed to The Bulletin, although its website retained the name norwichbulletin.com.

References

External links
 The Bulletin homepage

Newspapers published in Connecticut
Norwich, Connecticut
Mass media in New London County, Connecticut
Gannett publications